Leinebergland is a Samtgemeinde ("collective municipality") in the district of Hildesheim, in Lower Saxony, Germany. Its seat is in the town Gronau. It was formed on 1 November 2016 by the merger of the former Samtgemeinden Gronau and Duingen. It takes its name from the Leine Uplands.

The Samtgemeinde Leinebergland consists of the following municipalities:

 Duingen 
 Eime
 Gronau

Samtgemeinden in Lower Saxony